Okwa Camp One Airport  is an airstrip in the Kalahari Desert in Botswana. There is a small surface quarry adjacent to the poorly defined runway, and a small settlement nearby. The nearest town is Kang,  to the southeast.

See also

Transport in Botswana
List of airports in Botswana

References

External links 
OpenStreetMap - Okwa Camp One
OurAirports - Okwa Camp One
FallingRain - Okwa Camp One Airport
HERE Maps - Okwa Camp One

Airports in Botswana